Dariusz Klemens Sikora (born December 30, 1958) is a former Polish ice hockey player. He played for the Poland men's national ice hockey team at the 1980 Winter Olympics in Lake Placid.

References

1958 births
Living people
Ice hockey players at the 1980 Winter Olympics
Olympic ice hockey players of Poland
People from Piekary Śląskie
Sportspeople from Silesian Voivodeship
Polish ice hockey centres
Podhale Nowy Targ players